Edwin May may refer to:

 Edwin H. May, Jr. (1924–2002), U.S. Representative from Connecticut
 Edwin C. May (active 1975–1995), American parapsychologist
 Edwin May (architect) (1823–1880), American architect in Indiana
 Eddie May (Edwin Charles May, 1943–2012), English football player and manager